The Knight–Finch House was a house built by prominent local fruit grower and canner Newell James Knight (older brother of Utah mining magnate Jesse Knight) and his wife Eliza Stratton Knight, located in Orem, Utah. It was built in 1909, and added to the National Register of Historic Places in 1998. Joseph Finch and Ethel Davis Finch purchased the home in 1926.

References

http://www.orem.org/index.php?id=278&option=com_content&task=view

Houses in Orem, Utah
Houses on the National Register of Historic Places in Utah
Victorian architecture in Utah
Houses completed in 1909
National Register of Historic Places in Orem, Utah